Motherhood is a lost 1917 American silent drama film directed by Frank Powell and starring Marjorie Rambeau.

Cast

References

External links

1917 films
American silent feature films
Lost American films
Films directed by Frank Powell
1917 drama films
American black-and-white films
Silent American drama films
1917 lost films
Lost drama films
1910s American films